Zetela alphonsi is a species of sea snail, a marine gastropod mollusk in the family Solariellidae, the top snails.

Description
The size of the shell attains 16 mm.

Distribution
This species occurs in the Pacific Ocean off Chile.

References

External links
 
 Schwabe E., Heß M., Sumner-Rooney L.H. & Sellanes J. (2017). Anatomy of Zetela alphonsi Vilvens, 2002 casts doubt on its original placement based on conchological characters (Mollusca, Solariellidae). Spixiana. 40(2): 161–170.

alphonsi
Gastropods described in 2002
Endemic fauna of Chile